The 1972 Cal State Los Angeles Diablos football team represented California State University, Los Angeles as a member of the Pacific Coast Athletic Association (PCAA) during the 1972 NCAA University Division football season. The two games played against PCAA teams did not count in the conference standings. Led by second-year head coach Foster Andersen, Cal State Los Angeles compiled an overall record of 3–7. The team was outscored 257 to 155 for the season. The Diablos played home games at the Campus Stadium in Los Angeles.

Schedule

References

Cal State Los Angeles
Cal State Los Angeles Diablos football seasons
Cal State Los Angeles Diablos football